Rutherford Library is the first free-standing University of Alberta library, opened May 15, 1951, and named after the founder of the university, and long-time chancellor, Alexander Cameron Rutherford.

Overview

Rutherford Library was officially opened in a ceremony on May 15, 1951, in which former university president R.C. Wallace paid tribute to his former friend and colleague. The initial library inventory included most of Alexander Cameron Rutherford's personal book collection, of over 8000 volumes, with some select books having been gifted to Queen's University.

History

The plans for Rutherford Library were drawn up from 1948 to 1951, and included features that would make the new library one of the best in Canada. Durable building materials were specified, including all oak trim and doors, combined with marble floors and staircases with brass railings. As there was no previous free-standing library on campus, for over 5000 students, other than a reading room arrangement, the addition was welcomed by students and staff alike, heralding a new era for the university.

Rutherford North

A new wing of the library was officially opened on September 27, 1974, by Mrs. Hazel McCuaig (Hazel Elizabeth Rutherford) and designated "Rutherford North".  The distinctive brickwork of Rutherford North was designed by the architectural firm of Minsos, Vaitkunas and Jamieson in conformance with the structure of the original Rutherford Library. The Rutherford North design encapsulates and encloses the north face of the original building in a large open space. The new brick motif of Rutherford North was named "Rutherford Autumn Leaf" and registered in the building industry.

Partnerships and collaboration
The University of Alberta Libraries (Rutherford Library) is a member of the Association of Research Libraries, Canadian Association of Research Libraries, and is a contributor to the Open Content Alliance.

References

 "A Gentleman of Strathcona – Alexander Cameron Rutherford", Douglas R. Babcock, 1989, The University of Calgary Press, 2500 University Drive NW, Calgary, Alberta, Canada,

External links
Rutherford Library Location

Libraries in Edmonton
Research libraries in Canada
Academic libraries in Canada
University of Alberta buildings
Library buildings completed in 1951
University and college buildings completed in 1951
1951 establishments in Alberta
Libraries established in 1951